After Louie is a 2018 American romantic drama film written by Vincent Gagliostro and Anthony Johnston, directed by Gagliostro and starring Alan Cumming and Zachary Booth.

Cast
Alan Cumming as Sam Cooper
Zachary Booth as Braeden Devries
Sarita Choudhury as Maggie
Patrick Breen as Jeffrey
Wilson Cruz as Mateo
David Drake as William Wilson
Anthony Johnston as Lukas
Justin Vivian Bond as Rhona
Everett Quinton as Julian
Lucas Caleb Rooney as Mark
John Thomas Waite as Patrick
Joey Arias as Jai

Release
In March 2018, it was announced that Freestyle Digital Media acquired the rights to the film, which was released on March 30, 2018.

Reception
The film has a 75% rating on Rotten Tomatoes based on twelve reviews.

Ken Jaworowski of The New York Times gave the film a positive review and wrote, "Some stronger filmmaking would be welcome, sure, but After Louie has an honesty that’s often just as valuable."

David Rooney of The Hollywood Reporter gave the film a negative review and wrote, "But while it’s well-intentioned to a fault, and driven by deep convictions, the film also is diffuse, lethargically paced and short on thematic trenchancy, building powerful individual moments but seldom sustaining a compelling narrative thread."

Norman Gidney of Film Threat awarded the film two stars and wrote, "Even though the film has a plodding pace there are flashes of honesty and brilliance that make this film worth a passive look."

References

External links